Sandford Glacier is a channel glacier flowing to the east side of Porpoise Bay, about 25 nautical miles (46 km) south-southwest of Cape Morse. Delineated from air photos taken by U.S. Navy Operation Highjump (1946–47). Named by Advisory Committee on Antarctic Names (US-ACAN) for Joseph P. Sandford, Passed Midshipman on the brig Porpoise of the United States Exploring Expedition (1838–42) under Wilkes.

See also
 List of glaciers in the Antarctic
 Glaciology

References
 

Glaciers of Wilkes Land